The Yoruba people contributed significant cultural and economic influence upon the Atlantic slave trade during its run from approximately 1400 until 1900 CE.

Oyo Empire
From 1400 onward, the Oyo Empire's imperial success made the Yoruba language a lingua franca almost to the shores of the Volta. Toward the end of the 18th century, the Oyo army was neglected as there was less need to conquer. Instead, Oyo directed more effort towards trading and acted as middlemen for both the Trans-Saharan and Trans-Atlantic slave trade.  Europeans bringing salt arrived in Oyo during the reign of King Obalokun. Thanks to its domination of the coast, Oyo merchants were able to trade with Europeans at Porto Novo and Whydah. Here the Oyo Empire's captives and criminals were sold to Dutch and Portuguese buyers.

Cultural influence
In addition to the influence on slavery, and later Afro-American cuisine and language, the importation of Yoruba culture was most heavily evidenced in such manifestations of Yoruba religion as Santería, Candomblé Ketu, and other traditional spiritualities.

References

African diaspora
African slave trade
Yoruba-American history
Yoruba diaspora